90th meridian may refer to:

90th meridian east, a line of longitude east of the Greenwich Meridian
90th meridian west, a line of longitude west of the Greenwich Meridian